The Capture of Kimathi was the arrest of noted Mau Mau leader Dedan Kimathi during the Mau Mau Uprising in October 1956. Kimathi had been the field commander of the Mau Mau. He was captured by British police officer Ian Henderson who used intelligence gathered from disgruntled former Mau Mau.

Aftermath
Kimathi was sentenced to death and hanged on 18 February 1957 at Kamiti Maximum Security Prison. His death has come to be regarded as the end of the forest war in the Uprising.

Henderson was rewarded with a George Medal for his efforts and wrote a book about the experience, Man Hunt in Kenya. Shortly after the capture he was presented to Princess Margaret who was touring Kenya.

References

External links
Full text of Man Hunt in Kenya at Internet Archive

History of Kenya
Mau Mau Uprising
October 1956 events in Africa